Filipino German or German Filipino may be:

 Filipino mestizos of German ancestry
 Eurasian (mixed ancestry) people of Filipino and German descent
 Filipinos in Germany
 Germans in the Philippines; see German settlement in the Philippines
 Of or relating to Germany–Philippines relations

See also
 :Category:Filipino people of German descent